Moja štikla / Moj sokole (English: My High-Heel / My Falcon) is an EP by Croatian singer Severina. It was released in 2006 by Dallas Records.

The song "Moja štikla" (lyrics written by Severina herself), was the Croatian entry at the Eurovision Song Contest 2006. It finished in 12th place and peaked at #6 on the Croatian Top 20 Chart. The song was described in commentary as being in the turbo-folk style, with Severina singing about various chat-up attempts from local men, as well as entering into folk-influenced call-and-response lyrics with her backing singers.

Track listing

References

2006 albums
Severina (singer) albums